The Clinton Community School District is a school district in Clinton, Wisconsin, Rock County, Wisconsin, United States. The district has an elementary (4K-4th grade), middle (5th-8th grade), and Clinton High School (9th-12th grade). The school district is governed by an elected school board with seven members, each elected by the electors of the school district as a whole.

Demographics 
The school district currently has a demographic make-up that illustrates the changing nature of Wisconsin. 11% of our students are students with disabilities, 6% are students with English language needs, and 37% are economically disadvantaged. 13.7% of our students identify as Hispanic, 2.5% as Black, 2.5% as other, and 81% as Caucasian.

Athletics

High school

Boys 
Cross country running
Football
Basketball
Track and field
Golf
Baseball
Wrestling, which is coed.

Girls 
Cross country running
Basketball
Track and field
Golf
Cheerleading
Volleyball
Soccer

Middle school 
Boys Football
Girls Volleyball
Boys and Girls Cross Country
Coed Wrestling
Boys and Girls Track and field

Clubs and Organizations 
Art Club
Band
DECA
Drama Club
FFA
Forensics
German Club
Key Club
Honor Society
SkillsUSA
Spanish Club
Student Council
Yearbook

References

External links

School districts in Wisconsin
Education in Rock County, Wisconsin